Kilizman Martyrdom Monument is a martyrdom monument built by Kazım Dirik in Güzelbahçe, Turkey. It was built for memory of Turkish soldiers, Staff Colonel Nihat Bey and Çobanoğlu Ömer Zeki Bey, who died in Kahramandere.

References 

Monuments and memorials in Turkey